Eurythyrea is a genus of beetles in the family Buprestidae, containing the following species:

 Eurythyrea aurata (Pallas, 1776)
 Eurythyrea austriaca (Linnaeus, 1767)
 Eurythyrea bilyi Weidlich, 1987
 Eurythyrea eao Semenov, 1895
 Eurythyrea fastidiosa (Rossi, 1790)
 Eurythyrea grandis Deichmuller, 1886
 Eurythyrea longipennis Heer, 1847
 Eurythyrea micans (Fabricius, 1793)
 Eurythyrea oxiana Semenov, 1895
 Eurythyrea quercus (Herbst, 1780)
 Eurythyrea tenuistriata Lewis, 1893

References

Buprestidae
Buprestidae genera